Reiven "Rey" Bulado is a Filipino actor, ramp model, and entrepreneur born (17 December 1984) at San Carlos City, Negros Occidental.

He played Ibo on the 2004 MMFF entry film, Panaghoy sa Suba, on which he won the best supporting actor award, with multi-awarded actor Cesar Montano. He attended highschool at Colegio de Santo Tomas – Recoletos where he met a friend who encouraged him to pursue a career in show business. He appeared with minor roles on films such as Bilog, The Hunt for Eagle One and its sequel The Hunt for Eagle One: Crash Point.

He is a locally well-known guy who calls his male friends, "Paps"; and his local female friends, "Gang". He is the brother of Michael Angelo Bulado. He is the heir of some family-owned farmlands and commercial fish ponds and regularly enjoys working on these sites as an unofficial blue-collar guy. He is the rumoured owner of an unfinished mansion at Guihulngan City, about 40 kilometers or an hour ride from San Carlos City. Rumours spread across San Carlos as well that he is currently developing a Greek-style beach resort like the ones in Mykonos. Both establishments are scheduled to be operational anytime soon.

He is currently working on a real estate business within Metro Manila and might appear on another indie movie soon.

Filmography

See also
 San Carlos, Negros Occidental
 Colegio de Santo Tomas – Recoletos
 Guihulngan, Negros Oriental
 Metro Manila Film Festival
 Panaghoy sa Suba

References

Filipino male models
Living people
People from San Carlos, Negros Occidental
Male actors from Negros Occidental
Year of birth missing (living people)